Crassispira chacei is a species of marine gastropod in the family Pseudomelatomidae.

Description
It has a stout, brownish shell and resembles Crassispira turricula. The specific epithet chacei commemorates Fenner A. Chace Jr.

Distribution
This marine species occurs in the southern part of the Sea of Cortez, Western Mexico

References

 Hertlein, L. G. and A. M. Strong. 1951. Eastern Pacific expeditions of the New York Zoological Society. XLIII. Mollusks from the west coast of Mexico and Central America. Part X. New York Zoological Society, Zoologica 36(2): 66 120, 11 pls.

External links
 
 

chacei
Gastropods described in 1951